Linea  (plural: lineae ) is Latin for 'line'. In planetary geology it is used to refer to any long markings,  dark or bright, on a planet or moon's surface. The planet Venus and Jupiter's moon Europa have numerous lineae; Pluto and Saturn's moon Rhea have several.

References

See also
List of lineae on Europa
List of geological features on Venus#Lineae
List of geological features on Rhea#Lineae
List of geological features on Pluto#Lineae and escarpments

Planetary geology